The 1988 Texas A&M Aggies football team represented Texas A&M University during the 1988 NCAA Division I-A football season.

Schedule

Roster
QB Bucky Richardson, So.

References

Texas AandM
Texas A&M Aggies football seasons
Texas AandM Aggies football